OAKSTAR is a secret internet surveillance program of the National Security Agency (NSA) of the United States. It was disclosed in 2013 as part of the leaks by former NSA contractor Edward Snowden.

OAKSTAR is an umbrella program involving surveillance of telecommunications. It falls under the category of "Upstream collection", meaning that data is pulled directly from fiber-optic cables and top-level communications infrastructure. Upstream collection programs allow access to very high volumes of data, and most of the pre-selection is done by the providers themselves, before the data is passed on to the NSA.

The FY 2013 budget for OAKSTAR was $9.41 million. OAKSTAR consists of the following SIGADs:

Note: SIGADs not otherwise designated are presumed to operate under the legal authority of Section 702 of the FISA Amendments Act (FAA)

Glossary
DNI: Digital Network Intelligence
DNR: Dial Number Recognition 
MARINA: An NSA Database of Internet metadata
Timing advances: no explanation has been provided in the source material.
Transit Authority: A legal authority that states communications that transit the United States are collectible, provided that both endpoints are foreign.

Media Relating to OAKSTAR and Upstream Collection

References

Intelligence agency programmes revealed by Edward Snowden
National Security Agency operations
Mass surveillance